Save the Tiger is a 1973 American drama film about moral conflict in contemporary America directed by John G. Avildsen, and starring Jack Lemmon, Jack Gilford, Laurie Heineman, Thayer David, Lara Parker, and Liv Lindeland. The screenplay was adapted by Steve Shagan from his 1972 novel of the same title.

Lemmon won the 1974 Academy Award for Best Actor for his role as Harry Stoner (making him the first of six actors to win Oscars for both Best Actor and Best Supporting Actor), an executive in the garment industry who struggles with the complexity of modern life versus the simplicity of his youth.

We want to save the tiger. He and his partner Phil Greene (Jack Gilford), have kept it from collapsing by fraudulent accounting. He lives in a mansion in Beverly Hills and is obsessed with the past, which included combat during World War II. While driving to work he picks up a young free-spirited hitchhiker on Sunset strip, Myra. She offers to have sex with him but he declines. With no legal way to keep the company from going under, Stoner considers torching his warehouse for the insurance settlement.

The arson is agreed to very reluctantly by Greene, an older family man who watches Harry's decline with alarm. Through it all, Harry drinks, laments the state of the world, and tries his best to keep the business rolling as usual. This last task is complicated when a client has a heart attack while cavorting with a prostitute provided by Stoner, as he has been doing for important clients for years.

With nerves still shaky, Stoner takes the stage at the premiere of his company's new line, only to be overcome by war memories. The line, however, is a success. Stoner ends the day picking up Myra again who is still hitchhiking and spending the night with her.

Cast

Jack Lemmon as Harry Stoner
Jack Gilford as Phil Greene
Laurie Heineman as Myra
Norman Burton as Fred Mirrell
Patricia Smith as Janet Stoner
Thayer David as Charlie Robbins
William Hansen as Meyer
Harvey Jason as Rico
Lin Von Linden as Ula
Lara Parker as Margo
Eloise Hardt as Jackie
Janina as Dusty
Ned Glass as Sid Fivush
Pearl Shear as Cashier
Biff Elliot as Tiger Petitioner
Ben Freedman as Taxi Driver
Madeline Lee as Receptionist

Production
The movie was written by Steve Shagan and directed by John G. Avildsen. Lemmon was determined to make the movie, despite its limited commercial prospects, and so he waived his usual salary and worked for scale. The movie was filmed in sequence after three weeks of rehearsal in Los Angeles. There is also a novel version of Save the Tiger, by Shagan: the title comes from a campaign to save tigers from extinction for which Stoner signs a petition.

Reception
The movie failed financially at the box office, but critics and viewers who saw it liked the performance of Lemmon as Stoner. Critic John Simon wrote Save the Tiger 'is a film with good, serious intentions, and thus a somewhat touching failure'.

New York Times critic Vincent Canby called it "not a very good movie but it's a rather brave one, a serious-minded examination of some of the least interesting aspects of the failed American dream."

On review aggregator website Rotten Tomatoes, the film holds an approval rating of 89% based on 27 reviews, and an average rating of 7.2/10. The consensus summarizes: "Jack Lemmon's outstanding performance helps Save the Tiger grab early '70s American anxiety firmly by the tail."

Awards and nominations

See also

 List of American films of 1973

References

External links
 
 

1973 films
1973 drama films
American drama films
Films scored by Marvin Hamlisch
Films about businesspeople
Films based on American novels
Films featuring a Best Actor Academy Award-winning performance
Films directed by John G. Avildsen
Films set in Los Angeles
Films shot in Los Angeles
Paramount Pictures films
Filmways films
1970s English-language films
1970s American films